Gaetano Greco (c. 1657c. 1728) was an Italian Baroque composer. He was the younger brother of Rocco Greco ( c.1650 - before 1718). Both brothers were trained at, and later taught at the Poveri di Gesu` Cristo conservatory in Naples. Gaetano Greco's teachers included Giovanni Salvatore and Gennaro Ursino, and possibly Francesco Provenzale. It is also possible that he studied with Alessandro Scarlatti. Leonardo Vinci, Giuseppe Porsile, Nicola Porpora, and Domenico Scarlatti (perhaps also Giovanni Battista Pergolesi) were among his pupils. His successor at the conservatory was Francesco Durante.

Works, editions and recordings
Tuoni ecclesiastici con li loro versetti

References

External links

Italian Baroque composers
1650s births
1720s deaths
Italian male classical composers
Musicians from Naples
18th-century Italian composers
18th-century Italian male musicians